Eupithecia osornoensis is a moth in the family Geometridae. It is found in the Region of Los Lagos (coastal Osomo Province) in Chile. The habitat consists of the Valdivian Forest Biotic Province.

The length of the forewings is about 9 mm for males and 8 mm for females. The forewings are pale grey with medium and dark brown scaling. The hindwings are paler than the forewings, becoming darker distally. Adults have been recorded on wing in February.

Etymology
The specific name is derived from the type locality.

References

Moths described in 1987
osornoensis
Moths of South America
Endemic fauna of Chile